This is a discography for folk musician Rosalie Sorrels. It includes albums where she is the principal performer as well as tribute albums, retrospective albums, and compilation albums for a genre of music.

Albums—Primary vocal performer

Albums—Multiple vocal artists featuring Sorrels

Discographies of American artists
Folk music discographies